Yeray Patiño Blasco (born 19 May 1991), simply known as Yeray, is a Spanish footballer who plays for the Gibraltarian club Lincoln Red Imps F.C. as a midfielder.

Football career
Born in Elche, Alicante, Valencian Community, Yeray was a product of Elche CF's youth system and played his first senior games with the reserves in the 2010–11 season. On 16 May 2012, he made his professional debut, playing the last 15 minutes of a 1–3 away loss against AD Alcorcón in the Segunda División championship. He finished the 2012–13 season scoring 14 goals (3 only in promotion play-offs) in 41 appearances with the B-side, being promoted to Segunda División B.

In July 2013, after lengthy negotiations, Yeray signed a new two-year deal with the Valencians. He rescinded his link on 16 July in the following year, and subsequently joined CF La Nucía in Tercera División.

On 23 August 2015, Yeray moved to the Gibraltarian club Lincoln Red Imps F.C.

References

External links

1991 births
Living people
Footballers from Elche
Spanish footballers
Association football midfielders
Segunda División players
Segunda División B players
Tercera División players
Elche CF Ilicitano footballers
Elche CF players
Lincoln Red Imps F.C. players